This is a list of investigational attention deficit hyperactivity disorder drugs, or drugs that are currently under development for clinical use in the treatment of attention deficit hyperactivity disorder (ADHD) but are not yet approved. Chemical/generic names are listed first, with developmental code names, synonyms, and brand names in parentheses.

Under development

Preregistration
 TRN-110 [extended-release] - undefined mechanism / extended-release form of an undisclosed drug

Phase 3 clinical trials
 Centanafadine [sustained-release] (centanafadine SR, CTN-SR, EB-1020, EB-1020 SR) - serotonin–norepinephrine–dopamine reuptake inhibitor 
 Molindone [extended-release] (AFX-2201, EN-1733A, molindone XR, SPN-810, SPN-810M, Zalvari) - antipsychotic / dopamine D2 receptor antagonist and serotonin receptor modulator (e.g., serotonin 5-HT2B and 5-HT2A receptor antagonist) - specifically under development for impulsive aggression in ADHD 
 Serdexmethylphenidate (KP-484) - dexmethylphenidate prodrug / norepinephrine–dopamine reuptake inhibitor

Phase 2/3 clinical trials
 Edivoxetine (LY-2216684) - norepinephrine reuptake inhibitor

Phase 2 clinical trials
 CX-717 - ampakine / AMPA receptor modulator 
 Mazindol [controlled release] (NLS-0, NLS-1, NLS-10, NLS-13, NLS-2, Nolazol, Quilience) - serotonin–norepinephrine–dopamine reuptake inhibitor 
 PDC-1421 (BLI-1005) - norepinephrine reuptake inhibitor

Phase 1/2 clinical trials
 Dexmethylphenidate [controlled release] (CTX-1301) - norepinephrine–dopamine reuptake inhibitor

Phase 1 clinical trials
 AFX-2401 - "neurotransmitter modulator" 
 Atomoxetine [oral solution] (TAH-9922) - norepinephrine reuptake inhibitor 
 Brilaroxazine (RP-5000, RP-5063) - atypical antipsychotic / dopamine receptor partial agonist and serotonin receptor modulator 
 Dextroamphetamine [abuse-deterrent immediate-release] (ADAIR) - norepinephrine–dopamine releasing agent 
 Phacetoperane (NLS-3) - methylphenidate analogue / central nervous system stimulant / norepinephrine–dopamine reuptake inhibitor (?)

Preclinical/research
 Atomoxetine [oral suspension] - norepinephrine reuptake inhibitor 
 Dextroamphetamine [controlled release] (CTX-1302) - norepinephrine–dopamine releasing agent 
 Methylphenidate [extended-release/abuse-resistant] (COL-171) - norepinephrine–dopamine reuptake inhibitor 
 Methylphenidate/naltrexone (AVK-001) - norepinephrine–dopamine reuptake inhibitor and opioid receptor antagonist 
 NLS-8 - undefined mechanism 
 NNI-351 - DYRK1A inhibitor and "neurogenesis enhancer" 
 SHX-009 [transdermal system] - norepinephrine–dopamine reuptake inhibitor

No development reported
 AFI-002 - undefined mechanism 
 Altropane (123-I Altropane®, [123I]-E-IACFT Injection, [123I]NAV5001, CFT, Iodine-123-E-IACFT Injection, NAV-5001, O-587) - dopamine reuptake inhibitor / single-photon emission-computed tomography enhancer 
 Amphetamine [oral abuse-deterrent immediate-release] (ADAIR) - norepinephrine–dopamine releasing agent 
 Bavisant (BEN-2001, JNJ-1074, JNJ-31001074) - histamine H3 receptor antagonist 
 BCWP-E003 - undefined mechanism 
 BLI-1008 - undefined mechanism 
 Cannabidiol/gabapentin (Cannbleph) - cannabinoid receptor modulator and gabapentinoid 
 Ciforadenant (CPI-444, V-81444) - adenosine A2A receptor antagonist 
 CM-4612 (CM-ADHD, CM-AT, CM-PK) - gastrointestinal/pancreatic enzyme replacement therapy 
 CRD-102 - undefined mechanism 
 Dasotraline (DSP-225289, SEP-225289, SEP-0225289, SEP-225289-HCI, SEP-289) - serotonin–norepinephrine–dopamine reuptake inhibitor 
 Dextroamphetamine [abuse-resistant] (PF-08, PFR 08001, PFR08026) – norepinephrine–dopamine releasing agent 
 Dextroamphetamine sulfate [modified release capsules] (HLD-900, HLD-100) - norepinephrine–dopamine releasing agent 
 Dopamine [intranasal] (DopaMat, MPP-18) - dopamine receptor agonist 
 Eltoprazine (DU-28853) - serotonin 5-HT1A and 5-HT1B receptor agonist 
 Fasoracetam [co-crystallised] (AEVI-004, NFC-1) - racetam / metabotropic glutamate receptor modulator 
 GTS-21 (DMXB-A, DMXB-A sustained release, DMXB-A-SR) - α7 nicotinic acetylcholine receptor agonist 
 Guanfacine [once-daily] (Guanfacine Carrier Wave, SPD-547) - α2-adrenergic receptor agonist 
 IPX-233 (IPX233 ER C0003, IPX233-C0001, IPX233-C0002, IPX233-T0001, IPX233-T0002) - central nervous system stimulant 
 Masupirdine (M1, M1 of SUVN-502, SUVN-502, SVN-502) - serotonin 5-HT6 receptor antagonist 
 Methylphenidate [fast dissolve tablet] [Samyang Holdings Biopharmaceuticals] - norepinephrine–dopamine reuptake inhibitor 
 Nic-12 - undefined mechanism 
 NLS-2 - antianaemic / heavy metal / iron replacement 
 PD-3044 - dopamine reuptake inhibitor 
 Pitolisant (tiprolisant; BF-2.649, BF-2649, Ozawade, Wakix) - histamine H3 receptor antagonist 
 R-Sibutramine metabolite ((+)-desmethylsibutramine, (+)-didesmethylsibutramine, R-DDMS, R-desmethylsibutramine, R-didesmethylsibutramine) - serotonin–norepinephrine–dopamine reuptake inhibitor 
 Selegiline [transdermal] (Emsam) - monoamine oxidase B inhibitor 
 SKL-13865 (SKL-ADHD) - norepinephrine–dopamine reuptake inhibitor 
 Sofinicline (A-422894.0, ABT-894) - α4β2 nicotinic acetylcholine receptor modulator 
 SPN-811 - undefined mechanism 
 Taminadenant (NIR-178, PBF-509) - adenosine A2A receptor antagonist

Research programmes
 Ampakines / AMPA receptor modulators [RespireRx] (CX-516, CX-614, CX-707, CX-929, CX-1501, CX-1763, CX-1796, CX-1837, CX-1846, CX-1942, CX-2007, CX-2076) 
 Cannabis extracts [Cannabis Science] (CBIS GAP-001, CBIS LC-001, CBIS OBLD-001, CBIS OCD-001, CBIS PC-001, CBIS PPC-001, CBIS PS-001, CBIS SD-001, CBIS SSA-001, CBIS-OS-001, CBIS-PTSD-001, CS NEURO 1, CS-S/BCC-1, CS-TATI-1) - cannabinoid receptor modulators 
 Norepinephrine reuptake inhibitors / adrenergic receptor antagonists [Pfizer] (NRI-022, NRI-193, WAY-253203, WAY-256805, WAY-260022, WAY-315193, WAY-318068) 
 Pim2 / PolyPhetamine [ITL Pharma] 
 Subtype-selective glutamate NMDA receptor modulators / glutamate NR2B receptor modulators [Novartis]

Not under development

Development discontinued
 ABT-418 - nicotinic acetylcholine receptor agonist 
 Amphetamine [transdermal patch] [Noven/Takeda] - norepinephrine–dopamine releasing agent 
 Ampreloxetine (TD-9855) - norepinephrine reuptake inhibitor 
 AR-08 - adrenergic receptor agonist 
 Aripiprazole (Abilify, Abilify Maintena, Abilify MyCite, Abilitat, Ao Pai, Aripiprazole depot, Aripiprazole ECER tablets, Arlemide; OPC-14597, OPC-14597 IMD, OPC-31) - atypical antipsychotic / dopamine receptor partial agonist and serotonin receptor modulator 
 AZD-5213 - histamine H3 receptor antagonist 
 Bifemelane (SON-216) - monoamine oxidase inhibitor and weak norepinephrine reuptake inhibitor 
 Bradanicline (ATA-101, TC-0569, TC-5619, TC-5619-238) - α7 nicotinic acetylcholine receptor agonist 
 Brexpiprazole (Rexulti, Rxulti; Lu-AF41156, OPC-34712, OPDC-34712) - atypical antipsychotic / dopamine receptor partial agonist and serotonin receptor modulator 
 Buspirone [transdermal] (BuSpar Patch) - serotonin 5-HT1A receptor partial agonist, other actions 
 Cipralisant (GT-2331; Perceptin) - histamine H3 receptor antagonist 
 CX-516 (1-BCP, AMPAlex, BDP-12, SPD-420) - ampakine / AMPA receptor modulator 
 CX-1739 - ampakine / AMPA receptor modulator 
 Donepezil (Aricept, Aricept D, Aricept Dry Syrup, Aricept Evess, Aricept ODT, Aricept SR, Donepezil SR, E-2020, E-2022, Eranz) - acetylcholinesterase inhibitor 
 Droxidopa (3,4-dihydroxyphenylserine, 3,4-threo-DOPS, L-threo-dihydroxyphenylserine, L-threodops, Northera, threo-dopaserine, threo-DOPS) - prodrug of norepinephrine / adrenergic receptor agonist 
 Fasoracetam (AEVI-001, LAM-105, MDGN-001, NFC-1, NS-105) - racetam / metabotropic glutamate receptor modulator 
 Ispronicline (AZD-3480, RJR-1734, TC 01734, TC-1734, TC-1734-112) - α4β2-nicotinic acetylcholine receptor agonist 
 KP-106 (dextroamphetamine prodrug oral film) - norepinephrine–dopamine releasing agent 
 Lauflumide (flmodafinil, bisfluoromodafinil; NLS-14, NLS-4) - weak dopamine reuptake inhibitor, possibly other actions 
 Manifaxine (BW-1555U88, GW-320659) - norepinephrine–dopamine reuptake inhibitor 
 Mecamylamine (Inversine, Tridmac) - nicotinic acetylcholine receptor antagonist 
 MEM-68626 - 5-HT6 receptor antagonist 
 Metadoxine [sustained/extended-release] (pyridoxine-pyrrolidone carboxylate, pyridoxine pidolate; MDX, metadoxine SR, MG-01CI) - serotonin 5-HT2B receptor antagonist, GABA modulator, other actions 
 Methylphenidate [transdermal patch] (TAH-9901) - norepinephrine–dopamine reuptake inhibitor 
 MK-0249 - histamine H3 receptor antagonist 
 Modafinil (AFT-801, Alertec, Attenace, CN-801, CRL-40476, Modasamil, Modasonil, Modavigil, Modiodal, Provigil, Sparlon, Vigil) - weak dopamine reuptake inhibitor, possibly other actions 
 Nicotine/opipramol (ND-0801; opipramol/nicotine) - tricyclic antidepressant / monoamine and sigma receptor modulator and nicotinic acetylcholine receptor agonist 
 NS-2359 (GSK-372475) - serotonin–norepinephrine–dopamine reuptake inhibitor 
 OPC-64005 - serotonin–norepinephrine–dopamine reuptake inhibitor 
 ORG-26576 (ORG26576) - ampakine / AMPA receptor modulator 
 PF-3654746 (PF-03654746) - histamine H3 receptor antagonist 
 Pirepemat (IRL-752) - "cortical enhancer" / serotonin 5-HT7 receptor antagonist and α2C-adrenergic receptor antagonist, other actions 
 Pozanicline (A-87089.0, ABT-089) - α4β2 nicotinic acetylcholine receptor agonist 
 SEP-225432 - serotonin–norepinephrine–dopamine reuptake inhibitor 
 SGS-742 (CGP-36742, DVD-742, Lu-AE58479, SGS-742) - GABAB receptor antagonist 
 SPD-483 - undefined mechanism 
 SPD-554 (Guanfacine Carrier Wave project) - α2-adrenergic receptor agonist 
 SPI-339 (NEO-339) - undefined mechanism 
 TAK-137 - AMPA receptor potentiator 
 TC-6683 (AZD 1446, TC-6683) - α4β2 nicotinic acetylcholine receptor agonist 
 Tipepidine [sustained-release] (TS-141) - GIRK inhibitor 
 Vortioxetine (Brintellix, LU-AA21004, LuAA 21004, Trintellix) - antidepressant / serotonin reuptake inhibitor and serotonin receptor modulator

Research programmes
 Potassium channel modulators [Astellas Pharma/Icagen]

Formal development never or not yet started
 Dopamine precursors (L-phenylalanine, L-tyrosine, L-DOPA (levodopa))

Clinically used drugs

Approved drugs

Norepinephrine–dopamine releasing agents
 Amphetamine (Adzenys ER, Adzenys XR-ODT, Dyanavel XR, Evekeo, Evekeo ODT)    
 Dextroamphetamine (Dexedrine, Zenzedi, Xelstrym)  
 Fenethylline (Biocapton, Captagon, Fitton) - amphetamine and theophylline prodrug - discontinued/no longer used
 Lisdexamfetamine (Elvanse, Tyvense, Venvanse, Vyvanse) - dextroamphetamine prodrug 
 Methamphetamine (dextromethamphetamine; Desoxyn, Methampex)  
 Mixed amphetamine salts (Adderall, Adderall IR, Adderall XR, Mydayis) 
 Pemoline (Betanamin, Ceractiv, Cylert, Tradon) - withdrawn/discontinued due to toxicity

Norepinephrine–dopamine reuptake inhibitors
 Dexmethylphenidate (Focalin, Focalin XR) 
 Methylphenidate (Adhansia XR, Aptensio XR, Benjorna, Biphentin, Concerta, Cotempla XR-ODT, Daytrana, Equasym, Foquest, Jornay PM, Metadate, Metadate CD, Metadate ER, Methydur, MethyPatch, Oradur, QuilliChew ER, Quillivant XR, Ritalin, Ritalin SR)             
 Serdexmethylphenidate/dexmethylphenidate (Azstarys)

Norepinephrine reuptake inhibitors
 Atomoxetine (tomoxetine; Strattera) 
 Viloxazine [extended-release] (Qelbree)

α2-Adrenergic receptor agonists
 Clonidine (Catapres, CloniBID, Clonicel, Jenloga XR, Kapvay) 
 Guanfacine (Connexyn, Intuniv, Intuniv XR, Tenex)

Off-label drugs
 Bupropion (Wellbutrin) - norepinephrine–dopamine reuptake inhibitor and nicotinic acetylcholine receptor antagonist
 Modafinil (Provigil) - weak dopamine reuptake inhibitor, possibly other actions
 Reboxetine (Edronax) - norepinephrine reuptake inhibitor
 Serotonin–norepinephrine reuptake inhibitors (e.g., venlafaxine (Effexor), duloxetine (Cymbalta))
 Tricyclic antidepressants (e.g., desipramine (Norpramin) – norepinephrine reuptake inhibitor)

See also
 List of investigational drugs
 Potassium treatment for hypokalemic sensory overstimulation caused by ADHD sub-types.

References

Further reading

External links
 AdisInsight - Springer

Attention deficit hyperactivity disorder drugs, investigational
Experimental drugs